is a railway station located in the town of Fukaura, Aomori Prefecture Japan, operated by the East Japan Railway Company (JR East).

Lines

Station layout
Mutsu-Iwasaki  Station has one ground-level side platform serving a single bi-directional track. The station built with double opposed side platforms, but only  a single platform is currently in use; the other remains in-situ. The station is unattended, and is managed from Fukaura Station.

History
Mutsu-Iwasaki Station was opened on October 14, 1932 as a station on the Japanese Government Railways (JGR). With the privatization of the Japanese National Railways (successor of JGR) on April 1, 1987, it came under the operational control of JR East.

Surrounding area
Iwasaki fishing port

See also
 List of Railway Stations in Japan

References

External links

   

Stations of East Japan Railway Company
Railway stations in Aomori Prefecture
Gonō Line
Fukaura, Aomori
Railway stations in Japan opened in 1932